John Németh (born March 10, 1975) is an American electric blues and soul harmonicist, singer, and songwriter. He has received two Blues Music Awards for Soul Blues Male Artist in 2014 and Soul Blues Album in 2015. He has recorded ten albums since 2002, having also backed Junior Watson, Anson Funderburgh and Elvin Bishop. He has opened for Robert Cray, Keb' Mo', and Earl Thomas.

AllMusic noted that he is a "vocalist with great range, ability, and soulfulness, Németh had also developed into a top-notch blues harmonica player..." In 2013 alone, he was nominated five times for a Blues Music Award, making nine such nominations in total.

Early life and education
Németh was born in Boise, Idaho, United States. After singing at his local church, Németh played in local groups in his teenage years, and later formed Fat John & the 3 Slims with his friend Tom Moore. He toured and performed regularly working between five and seven nights a week for almost a decade.

Career
By 2000, Németh was supplying backing to Junior Watson, and separately fronting his own band known as The Jacks.  In 2002, he self-published the album, The Jack of Harps. His debut solo effort, Come and Get It, followed in 2004. The same year, Németh relocated to Oakland, California. Gaining more experience, he temporarily replaced Sam Myers in Anson Funderburgh's backing band in 2005 and 2006.

In 2006, he signed a recording contract with Blind Pig Records. Magic Touch, which was produced by Funderburgh and had Watson as a guest musician on several tracks, was issued in 2007. Living Blues stated "Magic Touch gives hope that the blues will survive." The release saw Németh nominated for a Blues Music Award in the 'Best New Artist Debut' category. Németh also appeared on Elvin Bishop's The Blues Roles On album (2008), which was nominated for a Grammy Award in the Best Traditional Blues Album category. Németh performed at the Blue Bear Live III concert on May 9, 2008 at the Great American Music Hall, to benefit the Blue Bear School of Music.  Németh's next release, Love Me Tonight (2009), reached number 6 in the Billboard Top Blues Albums Chart.

Németh's fourth solo release, Name the Day!, was released in 2010. It equalled the achievement of Love Me Tonight by peaking at number 6 in the Billboard Top Blues Albums Chart. Blues Live was recorded in February 2012 at three venues in the San Francisco Bay Area, and included guitar contributions from Kid Andersen. Soul Live was released in September 2012. In 2020, Németh signed with Nola Blue Records.  His album, Stronger Than Strong, was released on October 16, 2020.

Accolades
In 2013, Németh was nominated in five categories for a Blues Music Award.  These included 'B.B. King Entertainer', 'Contemporary Blues Album', 'Instrumentalist - Harmonica', 'Soul Blues Album', and 'Soul Blues Male Artist'. Németh performed at the Great Lakes Blues Society in April; the Simi Valley Cajun & Blues Music Festival in May; and the Jackson Rhythm and Blues Festival in August 2013. He relocated to Memphis, Tennessee in early 2013, and has stated that the Bo-Keys will back him on his next recording. In 2014, he won a Blues Music Award in the 'Soul Blues Male Artist of the Year' category. He was nominated again in the 'B.B. King Entertainer' category for the 42nd Blues Music Awards, scheduled to take place on June 6, 2021.

Discography

See also
List of electric blues musicians
List of harmonica blues musicians
List of blue-eyed soul artists
List of harmonicists

References

External links
 Official website

1975 births
Living people
American blues singers
American blues harmonica players
American people of Hungarian descent
Harmonica blues musicians
Electric blues musicians
Songwriters from Idaho
Musicians from Boise, Idaho
Musicians from Oakland, California
Singers from California
Songwriters from California
21st-century American singers
21st-century American male singers
Blind Pig Records artists
American male songwriters